Fishing Creek is an  tributary of the Susquehanna River in Dauphin County, Pennsylvania, in the United States.

Fishing Creek flows west through West Hanover and Middle Paxton townships and joins the Susquehanna River at the unincorporated community of Fort Hunter.

Another Fishing Creek exists directly across the Susquehanna River in the borough of Marysville, Pennsylvania.

See also
List of rivers of Pennsylvania

References

External links
U.S. Geological Survey: PA stream gaging stations

Rivers of Pennsylvania
Tributaries of the Susquehanna River
Rivers of Dauphin County, Pennsylvania